"They shall not pass" is a slogan, most notably used by France in World War I, to express a determination to defend a position against an enemy. It was also used during the Spanish Civil War by the Republican faction.

Origin

The widespread use of the slogan originates from the 1916 Battle of Verdun in the First World War when French General Robert Nivelle urged his troops not to let the enemy pass.  The simplified slogan of "they shall not pass" appeared on French war propaganda posters, most notably by French artist  in the last year of the war after the Allied victory at the Second Battle of the Marne.

Later during the First World War, the slogan was used by Romanian soldiers during the Battle of Mărășești, with the Romanian translation of the phrase being "", translating as "One does not pass through here".

The slogan was adopted on uniform badges by French units manning the Maginot Line.

Later use

French socialist politician Léon Blum (SFIO), in 1934, used this sentence "" against the Ligue's demonstration of the 6 February.  ("they") designated the fascist protesters.

It was also used during the Spanish Civil War, this time at the siege of Madrid by Dolores Ibárruri Gómez, a member of the Communist Party of Spain, in her famous "" speech on 18 July 1936. The leader of the Nationalist forces, Generalísimo Francisco Franco, upon gaining Madrid, responded to this slogan by declaring "" ("We have passed").

"" was used by British anti-fascists during the October 1936 Battle of Cable Street, and is still used in this context in some political circles. It was often accompanied by the words  (we will pass) to indicate that communists rather than fascists will be the ones to seize state power.

The phrase was brought to the public consciousness again following action in December 1943 by French-Canadian officer Paul Triquet of the Royal 22e Regiment; his action included his use of Nivelle's phrase "to win a key objective at Ortona, Italy, in the face of overwhelming German opposition."

In the 1980s, the phrase  was a theme in the civil wars in Central America, particularly in Nicaragua.  is also the title of a 1984 documentary by David Bradbury about the events in Nicaragua that led to the overthrow of Somoza's dictatorship.

Gallery

See also

 Awake iron!
 Molon labe
 Russian warship, go fuck yourself
 Order No. 227 (Stalin's "Not one step back" order)
 Venceremos
 Raised fist
 List of last stands

References

Anti-fascism in the United Kingdom
Communism
English phrases
Political catchphrases
Slogans
Battle cries
Battle of Verdun
1910s neologisms